The 2004 Australian Production Car Championship was a CAMS sanctioned national motor racing title open to Group 3E Series Production Cars. The championship, which was the 11th Australian Production Car Championship, was managed by Procar Australia as part of the 2004 PROCAR Championship Series. The championship was won by Chris Alajajian driving a Subaru Liberty GT.

Race calendar
The championship was contested over a seven-round series with two races per round.

Classes
Car competed in four classes based on the performance potential of each car.

Points system
Outright championship points were awarded on a 30–24–20–18–17–16–15–14–13–12–11–10–9–8–7–6–5–4–3–2–1 basis to the first 21 finishers in each class in each race. In addition, 3 outright championship points were awarded to the driver setting the fastest qualifying time in each class for race 1 at each round. Class championship points were awarded on the same basis as outright championship points.

Results

Note: The Toyota Corolla Sportiva was classified as a Class B car for Round 1 and as a Class C car from Round 2 onwards.

References

External links
 Image of 2004 champion Chris Alajajian (Subaru Liberty GT) at www.asphotos.com.au

Australian Production Car Championship
Production Car Championship